Vereeniging is a city located in the south of Gauteng province, South Africa, situated where the Klip River empties into the northern loop of the Vaal River. It is also one of the constituent parts of the Vaal Triangle region and was formerly situated in the Transvaal province. The name Vereeniging is derived from the Dutch word meaning "association".

Geographical information 

Vereeniging is situated in the southern part of Gauteng Province, and forms the southern portion of the Pretoria-Witwatersrand-Vereeninging (PWV) conurbation, and its neighbors are Vanderbijlpark (to the west), Three Rivers (east), Meyerton (north) and Sasolburg (south). The city is currently one of the most important industrial manufacturing centres in South Africa, with its chief products being iron, steel, pipes, bricks, tiles and processed lime.

The predominant language in Vereeniging is English followed closely by Sesotho language and Afrikaans.

History 

In 1879, George William Stow was commissioned by the Orange Free State government to look for coal deposits in the Bethlehem district With no deposits found he moved northwards to Maccauvlei on the Vaal River and then crossed the river to the Transvaal side. On the farm Leeuwkuil, he found a coal deposits twelve feet thick. But the Orange Free State government believed that it was too far away and there was a lack of transport so turned down the idea of mining. Stow settled in Kimberley in order to find a job where he met Samuel Marks who realized after hearing the formers story, the opportunity for coal at the Kimberley diamond fields for energy generation. Marks formed the De Zuid Afrikaanshe en Oranje Vrystaatsche Kolen and Mineralen Vereeniging (South African and Orange Free State Coal and Mineral Association) and sent Stow to purchase the farms where the coal was found. On the 25 November 1880 he purchased the farm Leeuwkuil for £5,000 and 12,000 acres. Marks' agent J.G. Fraser would purchase the farm Klipplaatdrift of 6,000 acres from Karl August Pistorius in October 1881 for £15,500. This was opposite the farm Maccauvlei. From 1881, coal was taken by ox-wagon to Kimberley and by 1882 there was so much development that there was a need to survey a village on the two farms and the Volksraad agreed naming it after the company's shortened name Vereeniging.

Second Boer War
The city is the location where the Treaty of Vereeniging ending the Second Boer War (1899–1902) was negotiated by the delegates of the South African Republic, Orange Free State and the British Empire. During the conflict, a concentration camp was set up in the area by the British. The concentration camp at Vereeniging was set up in September 1900, and by October 1901 housed 185 men, 330 women, and 452 children. Conditions at the camp were very poor: drinking water was brought by cart from a fountain (there was no direct water supply although it was situated next to the Vaal River) and there were only 24 latrines. Most inmates lived in bell-tents but there was a dispensary and a school. The Concentration camp was situated where the Mittal Steel plant (Vaal Works) is situated. Today, the Maccauvlei Golf Course is on the opposite side of the Vaal River to where the concentration camp was and a Garden of Remembrance is situated at Maccauvlei. All the British Soldiers killed in and around Vereeniging during the war were re-buried on this site.

Apartheid
Vereeniging was one of the first municipalities in South Africa to provide better housing for Africans.  Near Vereeniging is the predominantly black community of Sharpeville, Gauteng, the site of the Sharpeville massacre in 1960.

Post-Apartheid
Since 1999 its municipal services were provided by the Emfuleni Local Municipality. In 2018 the municipality was placed under administration after years of wasteful practices and poor service delivery. In February 2022 it was reported that Vereeniging had 14 out-of-service police vehicles for visible policing, and only 20 operational vehicles.

Flooding 2011 

In December 2010 and January 2011 the southern part of Gauteng and Mpumulanga experienced a higher than normal rainfall. This resulted in the need to release more water from the nearby Vaal dam.  As a consequence, parts of Vereeniging, Three Rivers and the rest of the towns downstream were flooded.

Trade and industry 

The city's motto is Per Pacem ad Industriam (Through Peace to Industry). It is currently one of the most important industrial manufacturing centres in South Africa, with its chief products being iron, steel, pipes, bricks, tiles and processed lime. Several coal mines are also still situated in the area, with reserves being estimated at four billion tons. Other mines nearby extract fire-clay, silica and building stone. Vereeniging also has several Eskom thermal power plants that supply electricity to the nearby goldmines.

Suburbs and municipality 

In the census of 2001 the population of Vereeniging was recorded as 73,283.

Vereeniging consists of 29 suburbs, of which 7 forms part of Three Rivers:

 Arcon Park & -Proper
 Bedworth Park
 Dickensonville
 Duncanville
 Falcon Ridge
 Fisheagle Estate (Three Rivers)
 Homer
 Kubali (Three Rivers)
 Leeuhof
 Peacehaven & -Proper
 Powerville
 Randwater
 Risiville (Three Rivers)
 Roodt's Gardens
 Roshnee
 Sharpeville
 Sonland Park
 Spider Valley
 Springcol
 Steel Park
 Three Rivers (Three Rivers)
 Three Rivers Proper (Three Rivers)
 Three Rivers East (Three Rivers)
 Uitvlugt
 Unitas Park
 Vereeniging Central
 Vischgat
 Waldrift
 Zuikerbosch
 Zuikerbosch Estate (Three Rivers)

Since 1999, Vereeniging has been part of the Emfuleni Local Municipality, along with Vanderbijlpark and the smaller Three Rivers.

Map of Three Rivers

Healthcare 

Various health services are available in Vereeniging.  The majority of these services are located in or near the major medical centres. These include:

 Vereeniging Medi-Clinic
 Midvaal Private Hospital
 Kopanong Hospital
 Sebokeng Hospital
 Nkanyezi Private Hospital
 Johan Heyns Hospital

Education 

 Vereeniging Gimnasium (Afrikaans medium - Amalgamation of Hoërskool Vereeniging and Hoër Tegniese Skool Vereeniging)
 Handhawer Laerskool ( Afrikaans and English medium) (http://www.handhawer.co.za)
 Selborne Primary School (English medium)
 General Smuts High School (English medium)
 Arcon Park Primary School (English medium)
 Unitaspark Laerskool (Afrikaans and English medium)
 Vryheidsmonument Laerskool (Afrikaans medium)
 Overvaal Hoërskool (Afrikaans medium)
 Sonland Park Primary School (English medium)
 Milton Primary School (English medium)
 Three Rivers Primary School (English medium)
 Riverside High School (English medium)
 Hoërskool Drie Riviere (Afrikaans and English medium)
 3 Rivers Christian Academy (English medium - ACE)
 Suikerbos Laerskool (Afrikaans and English medium)
 Rust-ter-Vaal Primary School (English medium)
 Rust-ter-Vaal Secondary School (English medium)
 Phoenix High School (English medium)
 Roshnee Islamic School (English medium)
 Word of Life School (English medium - CIE)
 Krugerlaan School (Afrikaans and English medium - LSEN School)

Tertiary institutions

Campuses of:
 University of South Africa
 Damelin College
 CTU Training Solutions
 Sedibeng College
 It is also close to the North-West University's Vaal Triangle Campus, and the Vaal University of Technology in Vanderbijlpark.

Notable residents 
 Gerald Raymond Bosch, played Fly-Half for The Springboks 1974 -1976
 Bles Bridges, an Afrikaans country singer, stayed in Vereeniging until his death in 2000.
 F.W. de Klerk was first elected to the South African parliament in 1969 as the member for Vereeniging.
 Francois Pienaar, Springboks rugby player 
 Charl Schwartzel (the 2011 US Masters champion), Morné Morkel and Albie Morkel attended Vereeniging High.
 Leon Schuster, actor, comedian, filmmaker, presenter and singer 
 Deon Dreyer, a cave diver who perished in Bushman's Hole in 1994, was raised in Vereeniging.

Crime 

The latest annual crime statistics for Vereeniging Police Precinct was issued by the South African Police Service (SAPS) in 2021. The SAPS crime report showed the following information:

Coat of arms

Vereeniging established a municipality in 1912.  By 1931, the town council had assumed an emblem depicting bridge across a river, and two clasped hands.

The town council obtained a coat of arms from the College of Arms in October 1955, registered it with the Transvaal Provincial Administration in October 1957 and with the Bureau of Heraldry in June 1987.

The arms were : Sable, on a fess wavy Or a barrulet wavy Tenne, the fess between in chief a thunderbolt between two picks, Or, and in base a steel pipe palewise proper between two cogwheels, also Or.  In layman's terms, the design is a black shield displaying, from top to bottom, a golden heraldic thunderbolt between two picks, a wavy orange stripe edged in gold, and an upright golden pipe between two cogwheels.

The crest was a dove of peace perched on two clasped hands;  the supporters were a lion and a zebra standing on a grassy base strewn with veld flowers;  and the motto was Per pacem ad industriam.

References

External links 
Emfuleni Municipality
Vaal Triangle Info
Crime Report Vereeniging 2010

 
Populated places in the Emfuleni Local Municipality
Second Boer War concentration camps
Populated places established in 1892